Aliza Green is an American chef and writer. In addition to being one of the first women chefs in Philadelphia, Pennsylvania, she is known as a pioneer of the farm-to-table movement. She was one of the first chefs in Philadelphia to deal directly with local farms and utilize locally raised food in her restaurants.  She writes as a food columnist and has published more than a dozen books about food.

Career

Aliza Green grew up in Washington, D.C. but was part of an extended family that included people in Israel and Borough Park, Brooklyn, a  Hasidic Jewish section of New York City. As a result, she traveled extensively and was exposed to different cultures and foods, even as a child.

A self-taught chef, Green opened her own catering business in 1975. Her first job as a chef was at the restaurant Under the Blue Moon in Philadelphia, PA. She studied briefly in Italy with Marcella Hazan. She then joined Ristorante DiLullo, where she became the executive chef for Joe Dilullo and won the restaurant a four-star rating. She also met her future husband, Don Reiff, the restaurant's architect. At Ristorante DiLullo,  Green cultivated connections with farmers, buying from them directly and commissioning them to grow and harvest desired plants and zucchini blossoms.

Green was recruited by Judy Wicks at the White Dog Cafe in 1984. There she developed a regional menu around farm-to-table cooking, focusing on food simplicity and fresh ingredients.

From White Dog, she went to Apropos, developing a menu around Middle Eastern flavors "long before Middle Eastern flavors were trendy".  She currently is the chef manager at Baba Olga's Cafe & Supper Club.

Although she lives in Philadelphia, Pennsylvania, Green has traveled extensively throughout the world, researching foods and the ingredients used in them. She also leads culinary tours in the Maremma and Umbria regions of Italy. She has written many cookbooks, beginning in 1997 with a collaboration with  Georges Perrier to publish recipes from Le Bec-Fin restaurant.  Since then, she has generally focused on specific groups of ingredients. Her publications include the successful Field Guide series.

Green has stated that women chefs and restaurant owners are still a minority:

Bibliography

Awards and honors
 Member of Les Dames d'Escoffier International
 1988, The Philadelphia Inquirer Hall of Fame as one of the top ten most influential people in the city's food industry
 2001, James Beard Foundation Award, Best Single Subject for Ceviche! : seafood, salads, and cocktails with a Latino twist, with Guillermo Pernot
 2004, The New York Times, Top cookbooks of the year for Beans
 2004, Houston Chronicle, Editor's Pick for Field Guide to Produce
 2012, Cooking Light, Top Cookbooks of the Last 25 Years, for Making artisan pasta

References

American chefs
American women chefs
American food writers
American cookbook writers
Women cookbook writers
Living people
James Beard Foundation Award winners
Year of birth missing (living people)
21st-century American women